Amin Nazari (born 26 April 1993) is a professional footballer who plays as a midfielder for the Philippines national team.

His brother Omid is also a footballer who used to play for Malmö FF.

Club career

Malmö FF
Nazari began playing football at Malmö FF at the age of five. He made his way up to the first team and made his Allsvenskan debut in a match against Mjällby AIF on 20 April 2011. Nazari signed a -year first team contract on 4 May 2011, keeping him at the club until the end of the 2013 season. He made his UEFA debut on 26 July 2011 in the 2011–12 UEFA Champions League third qualifying round against Rangers F.C. Nazari saw much more limited play during the 2012 season due to high competition in the central midfield. He only played one match during the season, a goalless home draw against BK Häcken. Back in Malmö FF during the 2014 season, Nazari made sporadic substitution appearances, adding up to a total of ten matches during the league season.

Loan spells
On 29 March 2013 it was announced that Nazari was to be on loan at Superettan club Assyriska FF until the end of the 2013 season. At the same time he extended his contract with Malmö FF until the end of the 2015 season. Nazari played 23 matches and scored four goals for Assyriska during his loan spell at the club. After having made sporadic appearances for Malmö FF during the 2014 season Nazari went on loan to Norwegian side Fredrikstad for the duration of the 2015 season.

Falkenbergs FF
On 7 January 2016 it was confirmed that Nazari had signed a contract with Falkenbergs FF in the Allsvenskan. Nazari scored his first goal for Falkenbergs on 21 February 2016 in the 2015–16 Svenska Cupen. He left the club at the end of 2017.

IFK Mariehamn
Nazari joined Veikkausliiga side IFK Mariehamn in May 2018.

Ratchaburi
After beginning his playing career with the Philippines, Nazari joined Thai League 1 side Ratchaburi Mitr Phol in February 2019.

Kedah
On 14 December 2019, Amin Nazari agreed to join Malaysia Super League side Kedah.

International career
Nazari was born in Sweden, his parents are from Iran and the Philippines. He is therefore eligible to play for Sweden, Iran or the Philippines. Nazari has stated that playing for Sweden would be the most logical choice should the opportunity arise in the future. His older brother Omid Nazari played for the Iranian national team and now he represents to the Philippines.

Sweden
In 2009, he played for Sweden's under-17 team during the 2010 UEFA European Under-17 Championship qualifying round, playing in all three matches and scoring one goal.

Switch to Philippines
In September 2018, it was announced that Nazari received a call-up from the Philippines.

On 6 September 2018, Nazari made his debut for the Philippines in a 1–1 draw against Bahrain. He was a starter during that match and was replaced by Adam Reed in the 73rd minute.

In November 2021, Nazari was called up to the Azkals for the AFF Championship. He scored his first international goal for the Philippines in their opening game of the tournament on 8 December 2021 against Singapore.

Outside football

Sponsorship
Amin Nazari has been outfitted by German sportswear manufacturer Puma.

Career statistics

Club
Updated 6 November 2020.

International goals
''Scores and results list the Philippines' goal tally first.

Honours

Club
Malmö FF
 Allsvenskan: 2014

References

External links
 Malmö FF profile 
 
 

1993 births
Living people
Footballers from Malmö
Citizens of the Philippines through descent
Filipino footballers
Philippines international footballers
Swedish footballers
Sweden youth international footballers
Sweden under-21 international footballers
Filipino people of Iranian descent
Swedish people of Iranian descent
Swedish people of Filipino descent
Malmö FF players
Assyriska FF players
Fredrikstad FK players
Falkenbergs FF players
IFK Mariehamn players
Amin Nazari
Kedah Darul Aman F.C. players
Ceres–Negros F.C. players
Amin Nazari
Footballers from Skåne County
Association football midfielders
Swedish expatriate footballers
Swedish expatriate sportspeople in Thailand
Swedish expatriate sportspeople in the Philippines
Swedish expatriates in Malaysia
Filipino expatriate sportspeople in Thailand
Expatriate footballers in Norway
Allsvenskan players
Superettan players
Veikkausliiga players
Norwegian First Division players
Sportspeople of Iranian descent
Nazari family